Argyroeides rubricauda is a moth of the subfamily Arctiinae. It was described by Harrison Gray Dyar Jr. in 1911. It is found in Colombia.

References

Moths described in 1911
Argyroeides
Moths of South America